Labbezenga is a small riverport village in Mali. This seaport is located just inside the border of Mali, along the Niger River. It was known as one of the greatest ports in West Africa in the 19th Century. The port is also a place of trade. Most of the villagers are fishermen, and the rest herd animals, such as goats.

Labbezenga is also mentioned in the movie Sahara, based on the book by Clive Cussler. The two adventurers, Dirk Pitt and Al Giordino, stop at Labbezenga when they first enter Mali.

References

Populated places in Gao Region